Xavier College, Panama, is a private Catholic primary and secondary school, located in a suburb of Panama City, Panama. The school traces its current presence to 1948. It is coeducational, pre-primary through high school, and is run by the Society of Jesus.

Notable alumni
 Juan Carlos Varela - president
 Stanley Heckadon-Moreno - conservationist

See also

 List of Jesuit schools
 Education in Panama

References  

Panama
Jesuit secondary schools in Panama
Educational institutions established in 1948
1948 establishments in Panama
Education in Panama City